Close Cover Before Striking is an EP by Luna. It contains two videos ("Lovedust" and "1995" from Romantica), as well as Rolling Stones and Kraftwerk covers. The digital re-release in 2011 added Led Zeppelin and Alice Cooper covers.

Track listing
All lyrics by Dean Wareham, music by Luna, except where noted.
 "Astronaut" – 4:00
 "Waiting on a Friend" (Mick Jagger, Keith Richards) – 4:46
 "Teenage Lightning" – 3:30
 "Drunken Whistler" – 3:13
 "The Alibi" – 4:12
 "New Haven Comet" – 4:32
 "Neon Lights" (Ralf Hütter, Florian Schneider, Karl Bartos) – 5:01
 "Dancing Days" (Jimmy Page, Robert Plant) – 3:41
 "Only Women Bleed" (Alice Cooper, Dick Wagner) – 3:36

Videos
 "Lovedust"
 "1995"

References

External links
Close Cover Before Striking on Luna's Bandcamp website with track listing

Luna (1990s American band) albums
2002 EPs
Jetset Records albums